Gergereh is a village in Chaldoran-e Shomali Rural District, in the Central District of Chaldoran County, West Azerbaijan Province, Iran. At the 2006 census, its population was 72, in 11 families.

References 

Populated places in Chaldoran County